The War Office was a department of the British Government responsible for the administration of the British Army between 1857 and 1964, when its functions were transferred to the new Ministry of Defence (MoD).  It was equivalent to the Admiralty, responsible for the Royal Navy (RN), and (much later) the Air Ministry, which oversaw the Royal Air Force (RAF).  The name 'War Office' is also given to the former home of the department, located at the junction of Horse Guards Avenue and Whitehall in central London.  The landmark building was sold on 1 March 2016 by HM Government for more than £350 million, on a 250 year lease for conversion into a luxury hotel and residential apartments.

Prior to 1855, 'War Office' signified the office of the Secretary at War.  In the 17th and 18th centuries, a number of independent offices and individuals were responsible for various aspects of Army administration.  The most important were the Commander-in-Chief of the Forces, the Secretary at War, and the twin Secretaries of State; most of whose military responsibilities were passed to a new Secretary of State for War in 1794.  Others who performed specialist functions were the controller of army accounts, the Army Medical Board, the Commissariat Department, the Board of General Officers, the Judge Advocate General of the Armed Forces, the Commissary General of Muster, the Paymaster General of the forces, and (particularly with regard to the Militia) the Home Office.

The term War Department was initially used for the separate office of the Secretary of State for War; in 1855, the offices of Secretary at War and Secretary of State for War were amalgamated, and thereafter the terms War Office and War Department were used somewhat interchangeably.

History
The War Office developed from the Council of War, an ad hoc grouping of the King and his senior military commanders which managed the Kingdom of England's wars and campaigns. The management of the War Office was directed initially by the Secretary at War, whose role had originated during the reign of King Charles II as the secretary to the Commander-in-Chief of the Army. In the latter part of the 17th century, the office of Commander-in-Chief was vacant for several periods, which left the Secretary at War answering directly to the Sovereign; and thereafter, even when the office of Commander-in-Chief was restored on a more permanent basis, the Secretary at War retained his independence.

The department of the Secretary at War was referred to as the 'Warr Office' (sic) from as early as 1694; its foundation has traditionally been ascribed to William Blathwayt, who had accompanied King William III during the Nine Years' War and who, from his appointment as Secretary in 1684, had greatly expanded the remit of his office to cover general day-to-day administration of the Army.

After Blathwayt's retirement in 1704, Secretary at War became a political office. In political terms, it was a fairly minor government job (despite retaining a continued right of access to the monarch) which dealt with the minutiae of administration, rather than grand strategy. The Secretary, who was usually a member of the House of Commons, routinely presented the House with the Army Estimates, and occasionally spoke on other military matters as required. In symbolic terms, he was seen as signifying parliamentary control over the Army. Issues of strategic policy during wartime were managed by the Northern and Southern Departments (the predecessors of today's Foreign Office and Home Office).

From 1704 to 1855, the job of Secretary remained occupied by a minister of the second rank (although he was occasionally part of the Cabinet after 1794).  Many of his responsibilities were transferred to the Secretary of State for War after the creation of that more senior post in 1794 (though the latter was also responsible for Britain's colonies from 1801, and renamed Secretary of State for War and the Colonies, an arrangement which only ceased with the establishment of the Colonial Office in 1854).

From 1824, the British Empire (excepting India, which was administered separately by the East India Company and then the India Office) was divided by the War and Colonial Office into the following administrative departments:

NORTH AMERICA
 Upper Canada, Lower Canada
 New Brunswick, Nova Scotia, Prince Edward Island
 Bermuda, Newfoundland

WEST INDIES

MEDITERRANEAN AND AFRICA
 Malta
 Gibraltar
 Ionian Islands
 Sierra Leone and the West African Forts, Consulates to the Barbary States

EASTERN COLONIES
 New South Wales
 Van Dieman's Land
 Ceylon
 Mauritius

The War Office, after 1854 and until the 1867 confederation of the Dominion of Canada, was to split the military administration of the British Empire much as the War and Colonial Office had:

In February 1855, the new Secretary of State for War was additionally commissioned as Secretary at War, thus giving the Secretary of State oversight of the War Office in addition to his own department.  The same procedure was followed for each of his successors, until the office of Secretary at War was abolished altogether in 1863.

In 1855, the Board of Ordnance was abolished as a result of its perceived poor performance during the Crimean War.  This powerful independent body, dating from the 15th century, had been directed by the Master-General of the Ordnance, usually a very senior military officer who (unlike the Secretary at War) was often a member of the Cabinet.  The disastrous campaigns of the Crimean War resulted in the consolidation of all administrative duties in 1855 as subordinate to the Secretary of State for War, a Cabinet job.  He was not, however, solely responsible for the Army; the Commander-in-Chief had a virtually equal degree of responsibility.  This was reduced in theory by the reforms introduced by Edward Cardwell in 1870, which subordinated the Commander-in-Chief to the Secretary for War. In practice, however, a large influence was retained by the conservative Commander-in-Chief Field Marshal Prince George, 2nd Duke of Cambridge, who held the post between 1856 and 1895. His resistance to reform caused military efficiency to lag well behind that of Britain's rivals, a problem that became obvious during the Second Boer War. The situation was only remedied in 1904, when the job of Commander-in-Chief was abolished, and replaced with that of the Chief of the General Staff, which was replaced by the job of Chief of the Imperial General Staff in 1908.  An Army Council was created with a format similar to that of the Board of Admiralty, directed by the Secretary of State for War, and an Imperial General Staff was established to coordinate Army administration. The creation of the Army Council was recommended by the War Office (Reconstitution) Committee, and formally appointed by Letters Patent dated 8 February 1904, and by Royal Warrant dated 12 February 1904.

The management of the War Office was hampered by persistent disputes between the civilian and military parts of the organisation. The government of H.H. Asquith attempted to resolve this during the First World War by appointing Lord Kitchener as Secretary for War. During his tenure, the Imperial General Staff was virtually dismantled. Its role was replaced effectively by the Committee of Imperial Defence, which debated broader military issues.

The War Office decreased greatly in importance after the First World War, a fact illustrated by the drastic reductions of its staff numbers during the inter-war period. Its responsibilities and funding were also reduced. In 1936, the government of Stanley Baldwin appointed a Minister for Co-ordination of Defence, who was not part of the War Office. When Winston Churchill became Prime Minister in 1940, he bypassed the War Office altogether, and appointed himself Minister of Defence (though there was, curiously, no ministry of defence until 1947). Clement Attlee continued this arrangement when he came to power in 1945, but appointed a separate Minister of Defence for the first time in 1947. In 1964, the present form of the Ministry of Defence was established, unifying the War Office, Admiralty, and Air Ministry.

Old War Office building

As early as 1718, letters from the Secretary at War were addressed from 'The War Office'.  His department had had several London homes, until it settled at Horse Guards in Whitehall during 1722, where it was to remain until 1858. Then, following the dissolution of the Board of Ordnance, the War Office moved into the Board's former offices in Cumberland House, Pall Mall; over the ensuing years it expanded into adjacent properties on Pall Mall, before finally being relocated to a purpose-built accommodation in what is now known as the Old War Office Building in 1906.

Between 1906 and its abolition in 1964, the War Office was based in a large neo-Baroque building, designed by William Young and completed during 1906, located on Horse Guards Avenue at its junction with Whitehall in central London. The construction of the War Office building required five years to complete, at the cost of more than £1.2 million.  The building is somewhat oddly shaped, forming a trapezoid shape in order to maximise the usage of the irregularly shaped plot of land on which it was built: its four distinctive domes were designed as a decorative means of disguising the building's shape.  It has around 1,100 rooms on seven floors.

After 1964, the building continued to be used by the Ministry of Defence by the name Old War Office.

On 1 June 2007, the building (other than the steps that give access to it) was designated as a protected site for the purposes of Section 128 of the Serious Organised Crime and Police Act 2005.  The effect of the act was to make it a specific criminal offence for a person to trespass into the building.

In August 2013, it was announced that the building would be sold on the open market with the goal of realising offers in excess of £100 million.  On 13 December 2014, the Ministry of Defence confirmed that the War Office building would be sold to the Hinduja Group for an undisclosed amount. The building was sold on 1 March 2016 for more than £350 million, on a 250-year lease, to the Hinduja Group and OHL Developments for conversion to a luxury hotel and residential apartments. As of March 2022, the building was to open at the end of the year, or in early 2023, and contain the five-star Raffles Hotel.

War Office departments
The War Office departments were as follows:
 Office of the Secretary of State
 Military Secretary's Department (1870–1964)
 Department of the Parliamentary Under-Secretary for War
 Directorate-General of Lands (?–1923)
 Directorate of Lands (1923– )
 Directorate-General of the Territorial and Volunteer Forces (?–1921)
 Directorate-General of the Territorial Army  (1921– )
 Central Department (Department of the Secretary)
 Department of the Chaplain-General
 Department of the Judge Advocate-General
 Publicity Section/Information Section
 Department of the Financial and Parliamentary Secretary (Finance Department)
 Directorate of Army Contracts (1924– )
 Imperial General Staff
 Directorate of Military Intelligence (?–1922)
 Directorate of Military Operations (?–1922)
 Directorate of Military Operations and Intelligence (1922– )
 Directorate of Military Training (1922– )
 Directorate of Army Staff Duties
 Department of the Adjutant-General
 Directorate-General of Graves Registration and Enquiries (?–1921)
 Directorate-General of Army Medical Services
 Directorate of Mobilisation
 Directorate of Organisation
 Directorate of Army Personal Service
 Directorate of Prisoners of War (?–1921)
 Directorate of Recruiting and Organisation
 Department of the Quartermaster-General
 Directorate of Equipment and Ordnance Stores (?–1927)
 Directorate of Movements
 Directorate of Quartering
 Directorate of Remounts
 Directorate of Supplies and Transport
 Controller of Surplus Stores and Salvage
 Surveyor-General of Supply (?–1921)
 Directorate-General of Army Veterinary Services
 Directorate of Works (1927– )
 Department of the Master-General of the Ordnance
 Directorate of Artillery
 Directorate of Factories
 Directorate of Fortifications and Works (?–1927)
 Directorate of Ordnance Services (1927– )
 Chief Technical Examiner for Works Services
 Directorate of Military Aeronautics (1913–1918)

See also
 Secretary at War
 United States Department of War

References

Attribution
This article contains text from this source https://Discovery.NationalArchives.gov.uk/details/r/C259pen-government-licence/version/3/  Open Government Licence v3.0]. © Crown copyright.

Sources

External links

 The Old War Office building – a history  — at MoD.uk

 
Government agencies established in 1684
Government agencies disestablished in 1964
1684 establishments in England
1964 disestablishments in the United Kingdom
1906 establishments in England
Government buildings completed in 1906
British defence policymaking
History of the British Army
Military history of the United Kingdom
Political history of the United Kingdom
Grade II* listed buildings in the City of Westminster
National government buildings in London
Edwardian architecture in London
Neoclassical architecture in London
Defunct departments of the Government of the United Kingdom
Whitehall